Sebastián Aguirre may refer to:

 Sebastián Aguirre (actor) (born 1998), Mexican actor
 Sebastián Aguirre (rugby union) (born 1976), Uruguayan rugby union player